Edith Soledad Matthysse is an Argentine professional boxer who is a former unified featherweight world champion, having held the WBA female title from 2013 to 2016 and the WBC female title from 2015 to 2016. She is the older sister of former welterweight world champion of boxing, Lucas Matthysse.

Professional career
Matthysse made her professional debut on 18 May 2007, scoring a four-round unanimous decision (UD) victory against Graciela Adriana Becerra at the Estadio Socios Fundadores in Comodoro Rivadavia, Argentina.

After compiling a record of 9–3–1 (1 KO), she challenged Yazmín Rivas for the IBF female bantamweight title on 4 February 2012, at the Gimnasio de las Liebres in Río Bravo, Mexico. Matthysse failed in her first attempt at a world title, losing via UD over ten rounds.

Following a UD victory against Antonia Ayala Vazquez in March, Matthysse faced former two-weight world champion Marcela Acuña on 10 May 2013, at the Auditorio Presidente Néstor Kirchner in Tapiales, Argentina, with the vacant IBF Inter-Continental female super bantamweight title on the line. Matthysse suffered the fifth defeat of her career, losing via ten-round UD with all three judges scoring the bout 99–91.

She bounced back from defeat with a UD victory against Anahi Yolanda Salles in August, before suffering another defeat, losing via ten-round UD against WBC Silver female featherweight champion Betiana Patricia Viñas on 27 September, at the Polideportivo La Colonia in Junín, Argentina.

In her next fight she challenged WBA female featherweight champion Ogleidis Suárez on 13 December 2013, at the Teatro Griego Juan Pablo Segundo in San Martín, Argentina. Matthysse defeated Suarez via UD to capture her first world title, with the judges' scorecards reading 100–90, 99–91 and 97–93.

She moved down a weight class in her next fight for a rematch with newly crowned WBO female super bantamweight champion Marcela Acuña. The bout took place on 23 August 2014 at the Sociedad Alemana de Gimnasia de Villa Ballester in Jose Leon Suarez, Argentina. Matthysse suffered her second defeat at the hands of Acuña, losing via ten-round UD with the judges' scorecards reading 98–92, 97–93 and 96–94.

After a UD victory against Lizbeth Crespo in a non-title fight in May 2015, Matthysse put her WBA title on the line in a unification fight against WBC female featherweight champion Jelena Mrdjenovich on 1 August in Caseros, Argentina. After the ten rounds were complete, Matthysse emerged victorious via UD to become the new unified featherweight champion, with the judges' scorecards reading 98–92, 97–93 and 96–94. The pair would have a rematch on 11 March 2016, at the Shaw Conference Centre in Edmonton, Canada, with Mrdjenovich gaining her revenge, dropping Matthysse to the canvas in the tenth and final round en route to a UD victory. Two judges scored the bout 96–93 and the third judge scored it 97–82 to hand Matthysse the eighth defeat of her career.

Following a UD loss against Natalia Vanesa del Valle Aguirre in June 2017, Matthysse suffered her third consecutive defeat, losing via UD against South American female super bantamweight champion Laura Soledad Griffa on 28 October 2017, at the Club Union Central in Villa María, Argentina.

She broke the losing streak with a UD victory against Anahi Yolanda Salles in August 2018, before defeating Cintia Gisela Castillo to capture the vacant FAB female featherweight title on 6 July 2019, at the Club Social y Plottier in Plottier, Argentina.

Her next fight came against WBO female junior lightweight champion Ewa Brodnicka on 4 October 2019, at the Hala Sportowa Częstochowa in Częstochowa, Poland. Matthysse suffered the eleventh defeat of her career, losing via split decision (SD) with two judges scoring the bout 97–93 and 96–94 in favour of Brodnicka, while the third judge scored it 96–95 for Matthysse.

Professional boxing record

References

External links

Living people
Year of birth missing (living people)
Argentine women boxers
Sportspeople from Santa Fe Province
Bantamweight boxers
Super-bantamweight boxers
Featherweight boxers
Super-featherweight boxers
World featherweight boxing champions
World Boxing Association champions
World Boxing Council champions